Expedition of Zayd ibn Harithah to Wadi al-Qura took place in November, 627AD, 7th month of 6AH of the Islamic calendar.

Wadi al-Qura was an oasis, about 7 miles from Medina. Zayd ibn Harithah set out with 12  men to survey this area and to monitor the movements of enemies of Muhammad.

However, the inhabitants in this area were unfriendly to Zayd. The people there attacked the Muslims, killed 9 of them, while the rest including Zaid bin Haritha managed to escape.

See also
Military career of Muhammad
List of expeditions of Muhammad
Muslim–Quraysh War
Usama ibn Zayd

Notes

627
Campaigns ordered by Muhammad